Veney is a surname. Notable people with the surname include:

Bethany Veney ( 1813–1916), American slave and memoirist
John Veney (1889–1955), American Negro league catcher in the 1910s
Keith Veney (born 1974), American basketball player